The Williams FW44 is a Formula One racing car designed and constructed by Williams that competed in the 2022 Formula One World Championship. The car was driven by Nicholas Latifi and Alexander Albon, who were in their third and first years with the team respectively. Nyck de Vries participated in the Italian Grand Prix in the FW44, replacing Albon due to the Thai driver suffering appendicitis. The chassis is Williams' first car under the 2022 technical regulations, and their first to be developed wholly under new owners, Dorilton Capital, with Jost Capito at the helm.

Design and development
The FW44 was first revealed on 15 February 2022 with a shakedown at Silverstone Circuit. Both Albon and Latifi drove the car. On the same day, Williams launched their new livery for 2022 which was a darker blue design compared to the previous predominantly white cars.

With 2022 featuring new technical regulations, the FW44 is a significantly different design to the FW43.  With a notably tight design around the sidepod radiators, aerodynamics from the front pushing air to the floor which will be generating ground effect. The FW44 once again utilised Mercedes AMG engines, however it is the first Williams to also utilise their gearbox.

During the first rounds of the season, paint was gradually removed from the FW44 to save weight. Discussions about removing the paint entirely happened, however did not materialise due to the marketing and sponsorship requirements of the team.

At the British Grand Prix, a major update for the FW44 was revealed with a new floor, sidepod design and rear wing. The design was similar to that of the Red Bull. At the following Grand Prix in Austria, Williams added further revisions to the front suspension of the FW44.

Racing performance
At the first round of the season in Bahrain, both Latifi and Albon were able to complete the race. In Saudi Arabia, both cars were involved in collisions but Albon was classified 14th due to the amount of race distance completed. At the third round of the season in Australia, the FW44 picked up its first point with Albon finishing in 10th. In Miami, Albon would finish in 9th place adding two more points to the team total.

Ahead of the Spanish Grand Prix, Nyck De Vries took the wheel of the FW44 in FP1. He completed 28 laps, and was classified in 18th position ahead of regular driver Nicholas Latifi.

At Silverstone, Albon was involved in a major incident at the first corner involving Zhou Guanyu, George Russell and Pierre Gasly. Zhou's Alfa Romeo flipped over the top of Albon's Williams before launching over the tyre wall into the catch fencing. Albon was sent to University Hospital Coventry for checks after the crash, however was released on the same day.

Complete Formula One results
key

References 

Williams Formula One cars
2022 Formula One season cars